The Ansonia Black Knights were a minor league American football team based in Ansonia, Connecticut. They began play in the Atlantic Coast Football League in 1962 and played their home games at Nolan Field. The team finished fourth out of six teams during the ACFL's inaugural season. Their head coach was Gene Casey, formerly a line coach with the University of Illinois and an assistant coach with Southern Connecticut State College.

As with many minor league football teams of the era, Ansonia was plagued by poor attendance and financial difficulties. After just two seasons in the league, the ACFL revoked the Black Knights' franchise at a league meeting in February 1964 and replaced them with the Hartford Charter Oaks.

Season-by-season

References

Atlantic Coast Football League teams
American football teams in Connecticut
Ansonia, Connecticut
1962 establishments in Connecticut
1964 disestablishments in Connecticut
American football teams established in 1962
American football teams disestablished in 1964